Kutrzeba can refer to:
 Tadeusz Kutrzeba, (1885 - 1947), Polish general
 Stanisław Kutrzeba, (1876 - 1946), Polish historian